The 1896–97 Drexel Blue and Gold men's basketball team represented Drexel Institute of Art, Science and Industry during the 1896–97 men's basketball season. The Blue and Gold played their home games at Main Building.

Roster

Schedule

|-
!colspan=9 style="background:#F8B800; color:#002663;"| Regular season
|-

References

Drexel Dragons men's basketball seasons
Drexel
Drexel
Drexel